Bagarić is a surname. Notable people with the surname include:

Branka Bagarić (born 1998), Bosnia and Herzegovina footballer
Dalibor Bagarić (born 1980), Croatian basketball player
Davor Bagarić (born 1985), Croatian footballer
Dražen Bagarić (born 1992), Croatian footballer
Marko Bagarić (born 1985), Croatian-born Qatari handball player
Matej Bagarić (born 1989), Croatian footballer
Sandra Bagarić (born 1974), Croatian opera singer and actress

Croatian surnames